Jane Zhang (simplified Chinese: 张靓颖; traditional Chinese: 張靚穎; pinyin: Zhāng Liàngyǐng; born October 11, 1984), is a Chinese singer-songwriter. She is one of the Chinese's leading contemporary recording artists. Known for her signature whistle register, she was dubbed the "Dolphin Princess".

Asia Music Chart Awards

Asia Song Festival

Baidu Entertainment Boiling Point

Beijing Pop Music Awards

Billboard Radio China Awards

BQ Weekly Awards

Budweiser Real Character Awards

Canada's Best Chinese Hits Chart Awards

CCTV Investigation Report of Chinese Entertainment Circle

CCTV-MTV Music Awards

CCTV-15 Global Chinese Music Top 10 Awards

China Fashion Awards

China Gold Record Awards

China Green Foundation Awards Ceremony

China Music Awards

China Trends Awards

Chinese Music Awards

Chinese Music Media Awards

Chinese Original Music Salute Awards

CNTV's Music King Hit Global Chinese Music Award

Cosmopolitan Beauty Awards

CSC Music Awards

Entertainment Awards

ERS Chinese Top Ten Awards

Fashion Weekly Magazine Awards Ceremony

Five-One Project Awards

Forbes China Celebrity List Awards

Forbes China Celebrity List Charity Awards

Global Chinese Golden Chart Awards

Global Chinese Pop Chart Awards

Golden Bauhinia Awards

Golden Melody Awards

Green China Awards Ceremony

Hello Asia! C-Pop Awards

Her Village International Forum Awards Ceremony

Hong Kong Film Awards

Huading Awards

Huaxi Urban Newspaper Annual Music Awards

International Charity Forum Awards Ceremony

iQiyi Awards Ceremony

Lifestyle Magazine Awards Ceremony

Metro Radio Mandarin Hits Music Awards

Migu Music Awards

Mnet Asian Music Awards

MTV Europe Music Awards

MTV Global Mandarin Music Awards

MTV Style Awards

MusicRadio China Top Chart Awards

New Weekly's China Pride Annual List

New York Chinese Film Festival

Outstanding Contribution to Chengdu City Awards

PETA's Sexiest Vegetarian Celebrity

QQ Music Awards

ROI Festival Awards

RTHK Top 10 Gold Songs Awards

Sina.com Internet Awards

Sina Music Awards

Sina Women's Fashion List Awards Ceremony

Singapore Hit Awards

Southeast Music Chart Awards

Southern Metropolis Entertainment Weekly's Star Citizens Awards Ceremony

Southern People Weekly's Youth Leadership

Sprite Music Chart Awards

Tencent Star Awards

Top Chinese Music Awards

Top 10 Attractive Women in China

TOM Online Honor Award

Tudou Young Choice Awards

TVB8 Mandarin Music on Demand Awards

V Chart Awards

Weibo Awards Ceremony

Weibo Movie Awards Ceremony

Wyndham Xingyue Role Model Ceremony

9+2 Music Pioneer Awards

Notes

References 

Awards
Lists of awards received by Chinese musician
Lists of awards received by Mandopop artist
Chinese music-related lists